The Law is a 1974 Universal Television made-for-television film directed by John Badham starring Judd Hirsch as defense attorney Murray Stone with John Beck,  Bonnie Franklin and Gary Busey.

Plot
The workings of a big city's legal system are seen through the eyes of people involved in a sensational murder trial.

Cast

Judd Hirsch as Murray Stone
John Beck as Gene Carey
Bonnie Franklin as Bobbie Stone
Barbara Baxley as Judge Rebeccah Fornier
Sam Wanamaker as Jules Benson
Allan Arbus as Leonard Caporni
John Hillerman as Thomas Q. Rachel
Gary Busey as William Bright
Gerald Hiken as Judge Arnold Lerner
Michael Bell as Cliff Wilson
Herbert Jefferson Jr. as Maxwell Fall
Frank Marth as Arthur Winchell
John Sylvester White as Judge Philip Shields
Robert Q. Lewis as Speaker at Bar Dinner
Logan Ramsey as Raymond Bleisch
Sandy Ward as Hoak
George Wyner as Deputy D.A. Piper
Ernie Anderson as Barry Hale - TV News Anchor
Reb Brown as Tommy Cicero
Dennis Burkley as Monty Leese
Don Calfa as Rod Brainard
Helen Page Camp as Mrs. Bright
Alex Colon as Felix Esquivel
Regis Cordic as Raymond Churchill
Ted Gehring as Detective Sargeant Manfred
Corey Fischer as Nicholson
Pamela Hensley as Cindy Best
Milt Kogan as Detective Milt Vinton
Luis Moreno as Melendez
Joel Oliansky as Wystan Lanier
Eugene Peterson as Leon Zuckerwaar
Anne Ramsey as Eleanor Bleisch
Brad Sullivan as Officer Newberg
Keith Walker as Dwight Healy
Charlie White as Gordon Riefler
Alex Wilson as Mrozek
Henry Brown as Reynaldo Williams

1975 miniseries
A 1975 TV miniseries of three further hour-long episodes was created for Hirsch's character, each directed by writer Joel Oliansky:
"Complaint Amended", March 19, 1975
"Prior Consent", March 26, 1975
"Special Circumstances", April 16, 1975

References

External links
 (1974 TV movie)
 (1975 TV miniseries)

1974 television films
1974 films
1975 American television series debuts
1975 American television series endings
Films directed by John Badham
Films about lawyers